Podbiel is a village in northern Slovakia.

Podbiel may also refer to:
Podbiel, Greater Poland Voivodeship (west-central Poland)
Podbiel, Masovian Voivodeship (east-central Poland)